Broadway Madness is a 1927 American silent romantic drama film directed by Burton L. King and starring Marguerite De La Motte, Donald Keith, and Betty Hilburn.

Plot
A young farmer in upstate New York City becomes obsessed with a Broadway actress due to her radio broadcasts. She later becomes involved in a plot to defraud him of his inheritance, but instead falls in love and confesses everything to him.

Cast
 Marguerite De La Motte as Maida Vincent 
 Donald Keith as David Ross 
 Betty Hilburn as Josie Dare 
 Margaret Cloud as Mary Vaughn 
 George Cowl as Henry Ableton 
 Louis Payne as Jared Ableton 
 Robert Dudley as Thomas 
 Orral Humphrey as Larry Doyle 
 Tom Ricketts as Lawrence Compton 
 Alfred Fisher as Ev 
 Jack Haley as Radio Announcer

Preservation
With no copies listed in any film archives, Broadway Madness is a lost film.

References

Bibliography
 Munden, Kenneth White. The American Film Institute Catalog of Motion Pictures Produced in the United States, Part 1. University of California Press, 1997.

External links

1927 films
1927 romantic drama films
American romantic drama films
Films directed by Burton L. King
American silent feature films
American black-and-white films
1920s English-language films
1920s American films
Silent romantic drama films
Silent American drama films